Cyborg is the second album by Klaus Schulze. It was originally released in 1973, and in 2006 was the nineteenth Schulze album reissued by Revisited Records.

All CD issues of this album prior to the 2006 reissue had the tracks "Synphära" and "Chromengel" incorrectly transposed (though the packaging was always printed correctly). "But Beautiful", the bonus track on the reissue is the first part of the concert which took place in Brussels at the Cathédrale St-Michel on 17 October 1977. Although the piece does not have perfect sound quality, it complements the rest of that concert, which had been released as part of the Historic Edition box set.

Track listing
All tracks composed by Klaus Schulze.

Disc 1

Disc 2

Personnel
 Klaus Schulze – organ, synthesizer, vocals, percussion
 Colloquium Musica Orchestra

References

External links
 Cyborg at the official site of Klaus Schulze
 

Klaus Schulze albums
1973 albums